Uthama Purushan is a 1989 Indian Tamil-language thriller film, directed by K. Subash, starring Prabhu, Revathi and Amala. The film, produced by V. Mohan and V. Natarajan, was released on 1 September 1989.

Plot 

Raghu (Prabhu), a womaniser, is married to Lakshmi (Revathi). Raghu works in a company and he falls under the spell of Rekha (Amala), his new secretary. At this juncture, one day he asked Rekha to come to a lodge for doing some office work with the wrong intention, Raghu has come to the lodge, but Rekha couldn't come and she informed her inability to come to Raghu by phone, Raghu has gone to attend the phone, at the time in his neighbour's room, a man killed a lady and put inside the bureau of Raghu's room. Inadvertently, Raghu vacates the room. Later, Raghu is arrested, then escapes from police custody and finally finds the real murderer.

Cast 
Prabhu as S. Raghunath, alias Raghu
Revathi as Lakshmi
Amala as Rekha
V. K. Ramasamy as Raghu's father
Nizhalgal Ravi as Rekha's husband
Charle as Sethu
S. N. Parvathy as Thangam
Thalapathi Dinesh as Dinesh
Kuyili in an item number
Raadhika in a guest appearance
Ishari K. Ganesh

Soundtrack 

The music was composed by Shankar–Ganesh.

 "Vaikka Varappukulle" – Mano, Chitra
 "Selaiyai Uduthuna" – Gangai Amaran
 "Suriya Dhaagangal" – Mano, Chithra
 "Thaai Paadinal" – Chithra, SPB
 "Vanga Kadal Idhu Vandhu Kulithidu" – SP Shailaja

Reception
P. S. S. of Kalki found cinematography and dialogues of the film as positive points.

References

External links 

1980s Tamil-language films
1989 films
1989 thriller films
Films directed by K. Subash
Films scored by Shankar–Ganesh
Indian thriller films